The 1941 San Jose State Spartans football team represented San Jose State College during the 1941 college football season.

San Jose State competed in the California Collegiate Athletic Association. The team was led by head coach Ben Winkelman, in his second year, and played home games at Spartan Stadium in San Jose, California. They finished the season as co-champion of the CCAA, with a record of five wins, three losses and three ties (5–3–3, 2–0–1 CCAA).

The team was due to play a benefit game against Hawaii in Honolulu on December 13, 1941, which was cancelled following the attack on Pearl Harbor. The team had already arrived in Hawaii, and players were assigned to police duty following the attack.

Schedule

Team players in the NFL
No San Jose State players were selected in the 1942 NFL Draft.

Notes

References

Further reading
 

San Jose State
San Jose State Spartans football seasons
California Collegiate Athletic Association football champion seasons
San Jose State Spartans football